Ivirua is a Cook Islands electoral division returning one member to the Cook Islands Parliament. Its current representative is Agnes Armstrong, who has held the seat since she won it in a by-election in 2019.

The electorate consists of the districts of Ivirua and Karanga on the island of Mangaia. It was created in 1981, when the Constitution Amendment (No. 9) Act 1980–1981 adjusted electorate boundaries and split the electorate of Mangaia into three.

Members

Electoral results

References

Mangaia
Cook Islands electorates